The 2021 Michigan Wolverines women's gymnastics team represented the University of Michigan in the 2021 NCAA Division I women's gymnastics season as members of the Big Ten Conference in their 46th season of collegiate competition. The Wolverines were led by head coach Bev Plocki in her thirty-second season, and played their home meets at the Crisler Center in Ann Arbor, Michigan. 

The Wolverines advanced to the NCAA Women's Gymnastics Championships for the 30th time in program history where they won their 13th regional finals title to advance to the NCAA Championships. Michigan won their first NCAA title with a program best score of 198.2500.

Previous season 
The Wolverines finished the 2020 season with an overall record of 12–1, in a season that was cancelled due to the COVID-19 pandemic.

Roster

Coaching staff

Schedule

Regular season

Postseason

Rankings

References 

2021 NCAA Division I women's gymnastics season
2021 in sports in Michigan
Michigan Wolverines women's gymnastics seasons